Stanisław Paździor (15 October 1944 – 28 March 2018) was a Polish footballer. He played in one match for the Poland national football team on 10 May 1972, a scoreless draw against Switzerland. His professional club career was mostly linked with the two Wałbrzych clubs; Górnik and Zagłębie.

References

External links

1944 births
2018 deaths
Polish footballers
Poland international footballers
MKS Cracovia (football) players
KS Lublinianka players
Górnik Wałbrzych players
Zagłębie Wałbrzych players
Zagłębie Lubin players
People from Andrychów
Association footballers not categorized by position